Grand Canyon National Park Airport  is a state-owned public-use airport located in Tusayan, CDP in unincorporated Coconino County, Arizona, United States. It is near Grand Canyon National Park,  from the South Rim of the Grand Canyon. The airport is primarily used for scenic tours and charter flights.

As per Federal Aviation Administration records, the airport had 294,436 passenger boardings (enplanements) in calendar year 2008 and 354,624 enplanements in 2007. According to the FAA's National Plan of Integrated Airport Systems for 2009–13, it is categorized as commercial service - primary.

History
The present day facility incorporates the site of the first official Grand Canyon airport, a landing field authorized by the U.S. Forest Service for commercial flights in 1925. The new airport first opened for business in October 1965. The airport terminal was completed and formally dedicated on October 20, 1967.

Today, the airport is the fourth most active air carrier airport in Arizona, following Phoenix Sky Harbor International Airport, Tucson International Airport, and Phoenix-Mesa Gateway Airport. Over 40 air taxi and commuter carriers serve the airport.

Facilities and aircraft

For the 12-month period ending August 31, 2019, the airport had 52,144 aircraft operations, an average of 143 per day: 93% air taxi, 6% general aviation, <1% scheduled commercial, and 1% military. At that time there were 39 aircraft based at this airport: 4 single-engine, 2 multi-engine and 33 helicopter.

Historical airline service
Grand Canyon National Park Airport had scheduled passenger jet service operated by several airlines at different times in the past including Air West, Hughes Airwest, Republic Airlines (1979-1986) and TriStar Airlines. Hughes Airwest operated Douglas DC-9-10 and McDonnell Douglas DC-9-30 jetliners to Las Vegas (LAS) and Phoenix (PHX) with continuing one stop, direct service to Los Angeles (LAX) and Burbank (BUR) while TriStar flew British Aerospace BAe 146-200 jets to Las Vegas (LAS) with direct one stop service to LAX. At one point, Hughes Airwest also operated Fairchild F-27 turboprop aircraft to Las Vegas and Phoenix with continuing, no change of plane service to Salt Lake City (SLC). Hughes Airwest was then merged into Republic Airlines which continued to operate DC-9 jet flights into the airport. During the summer of 1982, Republic was operating two daily DC-9 flights nonstop to Las Vegas (LAS) as well as daily nonstop DC-9 service to Phoenix (PHX) and direct one stop service daily to Burbank (BUR). By the mid-1980s, Republic had ceased all service into the airport.

Air West, the predecessor airline of Hughes Airwest, also operated Douglas DC-9 jets from the airport in addition to flying services with Fairchild F-27 turboprops. Bonanza Air Lines, which merged with Pacific Air Lines and West Coast Airlines to form Air West, flew from the airport prior to the Air West service and operated Fairchild F-27 turboprops as well with direct service to Phoenix and Salt Lake City with a daily round trip routing of Phoenix - Prescott, AZ - Grand Canyon Airport - Page, AZ - Cedar City, UT - Salt Lake City. Bonanza then expanded their F-27 propjet service with nonstop flights to Las Vegas and Phoenix. A 1966 Bonanza Air Lines print ad announced the air carrier's new service at the airport stating that Bonanza was "The only airline serving Grand Canyon" at the time.

The airport was also served in the past by America West Airlines operating de Havilland Canada DHC-8 Dash 8 turboprop aircraft to Las Vegas and Phoenix. Alpha Air, a commuter airline based in California that operated as Trans World Express (TWE) flying Beechcraft 1900C turboprops via a code sharing agreement with Trans World Airlines (TWA), also provided service with nonstop flights to Los Angeles (LAX) or Burbank (BUR) with the latter service continuing on to LAX. Inland Empire Airlines, another California-based commuter air carrier, operated nonstop flights to Los Angeles as well with Swearingen Metro propjets. Cochise Airlines, a commuter air carrier based in Arizona, served the airport with de Havilland Canada DHC-6 Twin Otter and Swearingen Metro turboprops and also Cessna 402 prop aircraft with flights to Phoenix, Tucson and other destinations in Arizona. In 1999 Sunrise Airlines was flying daily nonstop service between Phoenix and the airport with Beechcraft 1900C turboprops. Also in 1999, Scenic Air was operating daily nonstop service with a Grumman Gulfstream I propjet aircraft between Oakland, CA (OAK) and the airport.

A number of commuter air carriers also provided scheduled nonstop passenger service between Las Vegas (LAS) and Grand Canyon National Park Airport over the years. These airlines and the turboprop and prop aircraft they operated on the Las Vegas-Grand Canyon route are as follows with this information being taken from various Official Airline Guide (OAG) flight schedules from 1979 to 1999:

 Air Cortez - Beechcraft 18, Cessna 402, Fairchild F-27
 Air LA - British Aerospace BAe Jetstream 31
 Air Nevada - Cessna 402
 Air Resorts - Convair 580
 Air Vegas - Beechcraft 99, Cessna 402
 Eagle Canyon Airlines - Fokker F27
 Grand Airways - Cessna 402, Fairchild Swearingen Metroliner (Metro III aircraft). Grand Airways also operated McDonnell Douglas DC-9-30 jetliners into the airport on charter flights.
 Las Vegas Airlines - Piper Chieftain
 Nevada Airlines - Douglas DC-3, Martin 404
 Pacific National Airlines - Douglas DC-3
 Royal American Airways - Vickers Viscount
 Scenic Airlines - Fokker F27
 Silver State Airlines - Embraer EMB-110 Bandeirante

Airlines that operated jet service in the past between Las Vegas and the airport included Air West, Hughes Airwest, Republic Airlines (1979-1986) and TriStar Airlines.

Commercial aircraft as large as the Boeing 767-300 wide body jetliner flown by Vision Airlines on charter service have operated into the airport in the past.

Scenic air tours
Four companies operate scenic air tours over the Grand Canyon under FAR Part 135.

 Grand Canyon Airlines operates fixed-wing tours using customized  Twin Otters and Cessna Caravans.
 WestWind Aviation Service operates fixed-wing tours using Cessna Skywagons and Cessna Caravans to and from Deer Valley Airport and Page Municipal Airport.
 Papillon Grand Canyon Helicopters operates rotor-wing tours using Bell 206s and Eurocopter EC130s.
 Maverick Helicopters operates rotor-wing tours using Eurocopter EC130s.

Airport terminal tenants
There are currently four tenant businesses in the airport terminal.

 Grand Canyon Rental Adventures rents Polaris ATVs and camping gear.
 GC-Bikes rents electric bikes.
 Paragon Skydive offers tandem skydive services.
 WestWind Aviation Service offers fixed-wing scenic air tours over the Grand Canyon as well as service to Deer Valley Airport and Page Municipal Airport.

Accidents at or near GCN
On November 16, 1979, Nevada Airlines Flight 2504, a Martin 4-0-4 crashed after takeoff from GCN after a loss of power in the left engine and unwanted feathering of the prop and encountering a downdraft at the end of the runway. The aircraft collided with trees 7531 feet past the end of the runway and 2447 feet left of the extended centerline. The plane was destroyed by a post-crash fire, but there were no fatalities among the 41 passengers and three crew on board.
On June 18, 1986, Grand Canyon Airlines Flight 6, a de Havilland Canada DHC-6 Twin Otter Vista Liner 300, collided in mid-air at an altitude of 6500 feet with a Helitech Bell 206 in the area of Tonto Plateau. All 18 passengers and two crew perished on the Twin Otter along with five occupants on the helicopter.
On September 27, 1989, Grand Canyon Airlines Flight 5, a de Havilland Canada DHC-6 Twin Otter Vista Liner 300, crashed into trees after an attempted landing and go-around, killing eight passengers and two crew out of the 21 occupants on board.
On September 8, 2019, Christopher Swales, a 55-year-old man from the United Kingdom, died during a tandem jump. Police blamed holes in the parachute.

References

External links

 Grand Canyon National Park Airport (GCN) at Arizona DOT airport directory
 Aerial image as of 5 June 1992 from USGS The National Map
 
 

Airports in Coconino County, Arizona